is a Japanese dissident. After the Korean War broke out, he dropped out of Tokyo University, and decided to fight against Japan. He was multilingual and became a good shot by training. On November 23, 1956, he shot a policeman to death and received a life sentence. He was paroled in 1976. Following his release, he attempted to found an armed organization and collected guns. After being arrested for an attempted robbery in 2002, he was sentenced to 15 years in prison for the crime and also received another life sentence for his previous 2001 injury case. He was also suspected of the 1995 shooting of Takaji Kunimatsu, who was a chief of the National Police Agency.

References

External links
 About Hiroshi Nakamura
Armored car robber, 76, gets life The Japan Times
Robber's 15-year sentence upheld The Japan Times

1930 births
Living people
People from Tokyo
Japanese prisoners sentenced to life imprisonment
Prisoners sentenced to life imprisonment by Japan
Japanese people convicted of murder
People convicted of murder by Japan
Japanese people convicted of murdering police officers
People paroled from life sentence